Flathead Lake is a large natural lake in northwest Montana.

The lake is a remnant of the ancient, massive glacial dammed lake, Lake Missoula of the era of the last interglacial. Flathead Lake is a natural lake along the mainline of the Flathead River. It was dammed in 1930 by Kerr Dam at its outlet on Polson Bay, slightly raising the lake level; the dam generates electricity. The hydroelectric has been owned and operated by the Confederated Salish and Kootenai Tribes since 2015. It is one of the cleanest lakes in the populated world for its size and type.

Geography
It is a similar size as Minnesota's Mille Lacs Lake, but smaller than Red Lake. It is about half the area of San Francisco Bay (main bay). It is larger in surface area than Lake Tahoe, but it is much smaller in volume due to Tahoe's depth. This makes Flathead Lake deeper than the average depths of the Yellow Sea or the Persian Gulf. On the west side is U.S. Route 93, and on the east, is Route 35.

The lake is bordered on its eastern shore by the Mission Mountains and on the west by the Salish Mountains. The Flathead valley was formed by the glacial damming of the Flathead River and sustains a remarkably mild climate for a region located this far north and inland; the Pacific Ocean is almost  to the west. The mild climate allows for cherry orchards on the east shore and vineyards for wine production on the west shore. There are also apple, pear and plum orchards around the lake as well as vegetables, hay, honey, nursery tree, Christmas tree, sod/turf, and wheat production bordering or near the lake.

There are several islands in the lake.

Melita Island is a  island on Flathead Lake, located about one-half mile off the west lakeshore. The closest access is from Walstad Landing (one and a half miles), a state-maintained landing off Highway 93, approximately 15 minutes north of Polson. The island is owned by the Montana Council of the Boy Scouts of America, and is home to Camp Melita Island, and is used and for other activities; there is a project for woodland rehabilitation run by the Montana Council. There is also a bald eagle reserve which is protected by the Native Americans. Boy Scouts began using the island in the 1940s.

History
Once known as "Salish Lake", this body of water was named for the Salish Indians. Early European explorers, like David Thompson, called them the Flathead Indians because of a misinterpretation of early Native American sign language. A common misconception is that the name is derived from a practice of head flattening more common among tribes such as the Chinook. There is no evidence to show that the Salish ever had this custom. Since the late 19th century, the Salish were mostly removed to the Flathead Indian Reservation, located at the southern end of the lake.

The Seli’š Ksanka Qlispe’ Dam, built near Polson, regulates the lake's water level, generates hydroelectric power, and provides water for irrigation to support agriculture in the area. The lake has an irregularly shaped shoreline and a dozen small islands, the largest of which is a state park called Wild Horse Island. These islands cover .

The Flathead River and the Swan River (known also as the Bigfork River where it enters the lake) are the lake's major tributaries. The lake is inhabited by the native bull trout and cutthroat trout, as well as the non-native lake trout, yellow perch, and lake whitefish. Local residents have reported sighting other aquatic fauna in the lake as well, such as sturgeon and the Flathead Lake Monster.

The non-native opossum shrimp, (Mysis diluviana), were introduced by Montana Department of Fish, Wildlife and Parks in the Flathead drainage basin to encourage production of larger kokanee salmon; they migrated into Flathead Lake and have altered the ecosystem.

Fishermen had introduced lake trout 80 years prior but remained at low densities until the non-native Mysis became established. The bottom-dwelling mysids eliminated a recruitment bottleneck for lake trout by providing a deep water source of food where little was available previously. Lake trout subsequently flourished on mysids; this voracious piscivore now dominates the lake fishery. The formerly abundant kokanee were extirpated, and native bull and westslope cutthroat trout are imperiled. Predation by Mysis has shifted zooplankton and phytoplankton community size structure. Bayesian change point analysis of primary productivity (27-y time series) showed a significant step increase of 55 mg C m−2 d−1 (i.e., 21% rise) concurrent with the mysid invasion, but little trend before or after despite increasing nutrient loading. Mysis facilitated predation by lake trout and indirectly caused the collapse of kokanee, redirecting energy flow through the ecosystem that would otherwise have been available to other top predators (bald eagles).

Geology
Flathead Lake lies at the southern end of a geological feature called the Rocky Mountain Trench. The trench, which formed with the Rocky Mountains, extends north into the southern Yukon as a straight, steep valley, which also holds the headwaters of the Columbia River. During the last ice age this trench was filled by an enormous glacier. As the glacier moved southward it carved out the trench. The Polson Moraine, near present-day Polson, Montana, marks the southernmost extent of the glacier during the last ice age and thus is the site of the glacier's terminal moraine.

The large size of the Polson Moraine indicates that the glacier stalled here for many years before retreating. As the climate warmed, a portion of the glacier in the Mission Valley receded more slowly than the main body, which kept the lake basin from being filled with sediment. Eventually this ice also melted, forming a lake behind the moraine. Once the water reached the top of this moraine dam, it began to cut a channel through it. Most moraine dammed lakes drain quickly because water cuts entirely through the moraine. However, Flathead Lake remains because a bedrock hill buried underneath the Polson Moraine prevented the moraine from being completely cut through so the meltwater never completely drained.

At one time, probably when the valley was partially filled by a glacier, the level of Flathead Lake was about  higher and drained through the valley west of Elmo, Montana, which is at the end of Big Arm Bay, bottom center in the aerial photo above. Water carved out a wide, flat-bottomed pass with a deeper, narrow channel at the south edge of the pass. The deeper channel and traces of the dry riverbed are still visible from Route 28.

Fish

Flathead Lake is home to a number of native and non-native fishes, and is managed cooperatively by both Montana Fish, Wildlife and Parks and the Confederated Salish and Kootenai Tribes. The lake is home to the semi-annual "Mack Days" Lake Trout fishing contest, which aims to reduce the non-native "Mackinaw trout" or lake trout (Salvelinus namaycush) populations, as well as educate people about the Flathead Lake Fisheries Management Plan. Like the majority of other nonnative species, they became established in the lake from the late 1800s-early 1900s. The introduction of lake trout has placed increased pressure on the ecologically similar threatened native bull trout (Salvelinus confluentus).
Since the inception of this event in 2002, over 402,000 lake trout have been harvested.

Native
Cutthroat Trout
Northern Pikeminnow
Bull Trout
Mountain Whitefish
Westslope Cutthroat Trout
Nonnative
Brown Trout
Lake Trout
Golden Trout
Yellowstone Cutthroat Trout
Brook Trout
Rainbow Trout
Kokanee Salmon
Northern Pike
Yellow Perch
Largemouth Bass
Smallmouth Bass
Sturgeon (sp)

In addition to these commonly-pursued game fish, the lake is also home to other native species that currently are not actively managed by government fish and wildlife agencies, including the longnose sucker (Catostomus catostomus), redside shiner (Richardsonius balteatus), and slimy sculpin (Cottus cognatus).

Panorama

Notes

References
 Alt, David. "The Making of Flathead Lake" in Profiles of Montana Geology: A layman's guide to the Treasure State. Butte, MT: Montana Bureau of Mines and Geology, 1984.

External links

Flathead Basin Commission

Bodies of water of Lake County, Montana
Geology of Montana
Lakes of Flathead County, Montana
Lakes of Montana
Lakes of the Rocky Mountains